

Naomi Murakawa is an American political scientist and associate professor of African-American studies at Princeton University. Along with Kent Eaton, she is also the co-chair of the 2017 American Political Science Association (APSA) Section 24 meeting. Murakawa received her B.A. in women’s studies from Columbia University, her M.Sc. in social policy from the London School of Economics, and her Ph.D. in political science from Yale University. She is known for her 2014 book, The First Civil Right, which contends that American liberals are just as responsible for mass incarceration in the United States as conservatives are. In 2015, Murakawa won the Michael Harrington Book Award from APSA for this book.

Selected publications

See also 
 Keeanga-Yamahtta Taylor

References

External links
 Murakawa's faculty page
 Behind the News interview with Doug Henwood

Princeton University faculty
Black studies scholars
Yale University alumni
American women political scientists
American political scientists
Living people
Year of birth missing (living people)
American women academics
21st-century American women